The members of the Constituent National Assembly (the first National Assembly of South Korea) were elected on 10 May 1948. The Assembly sat from 31 May 1948 until 30 May 1950.

Elected members

Seoul

Gyeonggi

Gangwon

North Chungcheong

South Chungcheong

North Jeolla

South Jeolla

North Gyeongsang

South Gyeongsang

Jeju

Notes

See also 
1948 South Korean Constitutional Assembly election
1946 North Korean local elections
1947 North Korean local elections
People's Republic of Korea
National Assembly (South Korea)#History

References

001
National Assembly members 001